Croce di Monte Bove is a mountain of Marche, Italy. It has an elevation of 1,905 metres above sea level.

Mountains of Marche
Mountains of the Apennines